Kaman Road is a Railway Station in Naigaon East on the Vasai Road–Diva–Panvel Rail Route of the Central Line of the Mumbai Suburban Railway network.

Kaman Road is the next Railway Station after Kharbao Railway Station in the South & before Juchandra Railway Station in the North. 

Kaman Road Railway Station is situated in the area of Navghar also called Sasunavghar in the Eastern part of Naigaon, Maharashtra, India. This Railway Station is easily accessible by road from Naigaon East Railway Station (Western Line) & Juchandra Railway Station -[located in Naigaon East] (Central Line). 

Kaman Road Railway Station is beneficial for the people residing in Navghar area of Naigaon East to travel towards Diva Jn. & Panvel Rail Stations in the South & Vasai Road Rail Station in the North.  

Kaman Road is a Railway Station located near National Highway 48
 

Railway stations in Palghar district
Mumbai Suburban Railway stations
Mumbai CR railway division
Transport in Vasai-Virar